Roland is a town in Sequoyah County, Oklahoma, United States. It is part of the Fort Smith, Arkansas-Oklahoma Metropolitan Statistical Area. The population was 3,169 at the 2010 census, compared to the figure of 2,842 recorded in 2000.

History
This area was a dispersed rural community in the Cherokee Nation during the 19th century, until 1888, when the Kansas and Arkansas Valley Railway (KAVR) built a railroad line through it.

Meanwhile, the formerly-dispersed residents coalesced into a small town called either Garrison or Garrison Creek. A post office was established in the town in 1902, and the town renamed itself as Roland in 1904. The 1910 census recorded 228 residents.

Geography
Roland is located at  (35.418013, -94.514815).

Demographics

As of the census of 2000, there were 2,842 people, 1,055 households, and 815 families in the town. The racial makeup of the town was 73.89% White, 4.57% African American, 11.22% Native American, 0.14% Asian, 0.04% Pacific Islander, 0.77% from other races, and 9.36% from two or more races. Hispanic or Latino of any race were 3.10% of the population.

There were 1,055 households, out of which 41.0% had children under the age of 18 living with them, 56.8% were married couples living together, 17.2% had a female householder with no husband present, and 22.7% were non-families. 19.5% of all households were made up of individuals, and 8.9% had someone living alone who was 65 years of age or older. The average household size was 2.69 and the average family size was 3.09.

In the town, the population was spread out, with 31.5% under the age of 18, 9.5% from 18 to 24, 29.0% from 25 to 44, 19.6% from 45 to 64, and 10.4% who were 65 years of age or older. The median age was 31 years. For every 100 females, there were 90.1 males. For every 100 females age 18 and over, there were 85.2 males.

The median income for a household in the town was $29,015, and the median income for a family was $32,863. Males had a median income of $26,294 versus $19,779 for females. The per capita income for the town was $13,410. About 16.9% of families and 20.9% of the population were below the poverty line, including 26.9% of those under age 18 and 13.3% of those age 65 or over.

Notable person
Joshua Wheeler (1975-2015); first American soldier to be killed in Iraq since 2011, born in Roland.

Notes

See also
Cherokee Casino Roland

References

External links
 The Official Roland Schools Website

Towns in Oklahoma
Towns in Sequoyah County, Oklahoma
Fort Smith metropolitan area
Populated places established in 1888